The Top may refer to

 The Top (album), a 1984 album by The Cure
 "The Top" (short story), a short story by Franz Kafka

See also
Top (disambiguation)